Fire Wind is the second album released by Electric Sun. It was released in 1981 by Metronome GmbH.

Track listing
All compositions by Uli Roth
 Cast Away Your Chains 3:56
 Indian Dawn 5:16
 I'll Be Loving You Always 5:00
 Firewind 5:03
 Prelude in Space Minor 1:22
 Just Another Rainbow 3:54
 Children of the Sea 3:23
 Chaplin and I 5:45
 Enola Gay (Hiroshima Today?) 10:37
a) Enola Gay
b) Tune of Japan
c) Attack
d) Lament

Personnel
Electric Sun
Uli Roth – guitar, vocals
Sidhatta Gautama – drums
Ule Ritgen – bass guitar

References

1981 albums
Electric Sun albums
albums recorded at Olympic Sound Studios